Samuel N. C. Lieu   (b. 4 March 1950) is a historian of Manichaeism and Christianity in Central Asia and China.

Biography
Born in Hong Kong and educated at St. Paul's College, Lieu received a BA in Ancient and Medieval History from Emmanuel College, Cambridge in 1969. He later moved to the University of Oxford where he completed a DPhil in Ancient History in 1981, writing a comparative study on Manichaeism in the Later Roman Empire and Medieval China, and worked as a Junior Research Fellow in Wolfson College, Oxford (1974-1976). He became a Lecturer in Ancient History at University of Warwick and was eventually promoted to full professor (1976-1996). In 1996, he became Professor of Ancient History at Macquarie University, becoming a Distinguished Professor in 2010 and retiring in 2016 and becoming Emeritus Professor in 2017.

He has been elected a Fellow of the Royal Asiatic Society (1981), Fellow of the Royal Historical Society (1983), 
Fellow of the Society of Antiquaries (1989), 
Fellow of the Australian Academy of the Humanities (1999), and Fellow of the British Academy (2021). A festschrift has been prepared in his honour, entitled Byzantium to China: Religion, History and Culture on the Silk Roads: Studies in Honour of Samuel N.C. Lieu (2022).

He married Judith Lieu, a British theologian and historian of early Christianity, in 1976.

Works

Monographs

Edited volumes

References

1950 births
Academics of the University of Oxford
Alumni of the University of Cambridge
Alumni of the University of Oxford
Fellows of the British Academy
Living people